Lacuna is the debut studio album by English band Childhood. It was released on 11  August 2014 under Marathon Artists.

Critical reception
Lacuna was met with generally favorable reviews from critics. At Metacritic, which assigns a weighted average rating out of 100 to reviews from mainstream publications, this release received an average score of 68, based on 11 reviews.

Accolades

Track listing

Charts

References

2014 debut albums
Marathon Artists albums